The Willacy County Courthouse is a historic three-story building in Raymondville, Texas, and the former courthouse of Willacy County, Texas. It was designed in the Classical Revival architectural style, and it was the county courthouse until February 2015. It has been listed on the National Register of Historic Places since January 17, 2017.

References

National Register of Historic Places in Willacy County, Texas
Neoclassical architecture in Texas